The 1999 Korea Cup was the 23rd and the last competition of Korea Cup. It was held from 12 to 19 June 1999, and was won by Croatia.

Squads

Standings

Matches

See also
Korea Cup
South Korea national football team results

References

External links
Korea Cup 1999 at RSSSF

1999